The 1936 Pau Grand Prix was a Grand Prix motor race held on 1 March 1936. This race was part of the 1936 Grand Prix season as a non-championship race. The race was won by French driver Philippe Étancelin in his Maserati V8. Three cars entered by Scuderia Ferrari were due to race but stopped at the French border by Benito Mussolini, saying that no Italian team should race in France until after the meeting of the League of Nations on the 10 March.

Results

Qualifying

Race

References

Pau
Pau Grand Prix
1936 in French motorsport